Acacia clydonophora is a shrub belonging to the genus Acacia and the subgenus Phyllodineae that is endemic to Western Australia.

Description
It has prominently striate-ribbed branchlets. The green, oblique phyllodes have an elliptic to narrowly elliptic shape although some have a obovate to oblanceolate or even lanceolate shape. It blooms from April to November and produces creamy-yellow flowers. The inflorescences occur in clusters of 3 to 14 headed racemes with loosely packed spherical flower-heads containing five to seven cream to creamy yellow.

Distribution
It is native to an area along the west coast in the Wheatbelt region of Western Australia between Dandaragan in the north to Chittering in the south where it is found on and among breakaways and lateritic ridges growing in sandy or loamy soils over lateritic gravel.

See also
List of Acacia species

References

clydonophora
Acacias of Western Australia
Plants described in 1995
Taxa named by Bruce Maslin
Wheatbelt (Western Australia)